Trinity Episcopal Church and Cemetery is a historic church and cemetery on Church Street in Abbeville, South Carolina.

It was built in 1860 and added to the National Register in 1971.

References

External links
 

Episcopal churches in South Carolina
Churches on the National Register of Historic Places in South Carolina
Gothic Revival church buildings in South Carolina
Churches completed in 1860
Anglican cemeteries in the United States
19th-century Episcopal church buildings
Buildings and structures in Abbeville County, South Carolina
Historic American Buildings Survey in South Carolina
National Register of Historic Places in Abbeville County, South Carolina